The 13th Tank Battalion "M.O. Pascucci" is an inactive tank battalion of the Italian Army based in Cordenons in Friuli Venezia Giulia. Originally the battalion, like all Italian tank units, was part of the infantry, but since 1 June 1999 it has been part of the cavalry. Operationally, the battalion was last assigned to the Armored Brigade "Ariete".

History 
The battalion was formed during the 1975 army reform: on 15 July 1976 the 182nd Armored Infantry Regiment "Garibaldi" was disbanded and the next day its XI Bersaglieri Battalion became the 11th Bersaglieri Battalion "Caprera", while its XIII Tank Battalion became the 13th Tank Battalion "M.O. Pascucci". As the flag and traditions of the 182nd Regiment "Garibaldi" were assigned to the 11th Caprera the 13th Pascucci was granted a new flag on 12 November 1976 by decree 846 of the President of the Italian Republic Giovanni Leone. 

The battalion received the traditions of the XIII Tank Battalion "M", which had been formed by the 32nd Tank Infantry Regiment in October 1941 and sent to Italian Libya in August 1942 to bring the 132nd Tank Infantry Regiment up to strength for the Battle of Alam el Halfa. The XIII fought to annihilation in the Second Battle of El Alamein and by 5 November 1942 had ceased to exist.

After World War II the XIII Tank Battalion was reformed in Sacile in 1961 as tank component of the 182nd Armored Infantry Regiment "Garibaldi", which was the armored formation of the Infantry Division "Folgore".

Tank and armored battalions created during the 1975 army reform were all named for officers, soldiers and partisans, who were posthumously awarded Italy's highest military honor the Gold Medal of Military Valour for heroism during World War II. The 13th Tank Battalion's name commemorated 132nd Tank Infantry Regiment Lieutenant Luigi Arbib Pascucci, who had served in the XIII Tank Battalion "M" and was killed in action on 4 November 1942 during the Second Battle of El Alamein. Equipped with Leopard 1A2 main battle tanks the battalion joined the Mechanized Brigade "Brescia".

In 1986 the Italian Army disbanded the divisional level and the Mechanized Brigade "Brescia" joined the 3rd Army Corps in Milan on 1 October 1986. On the same date the 13th Tank Battalion "M.O. Pascucci" was transferred to the Armored Brigade "Ariete".

After the end of the Cold War the Italian Army began to draw down its forces and therefore the 13th Pascucci was reduced to a reserve unit and transferred to the Mechanized Brigade "Mantova" on 10 December 1989. The 13th Tank Battalion "M.O.Pascucci" was disbanded on 31 March 1991 and its flag transferred to the Shrine of the Flags at the Vittoriano in Rome.

See also 
 Armored Brigade "Ariete"

References

Tank Battalions of Italy